Kalotermitidae is a family of termites, commonly known as drywood termites. Kalotermitidae includes 21 genera and 419 species. The family has a cosmopolitan circumtropical distribution, and is found in functionally arid environments.

Biology
The Kalotermitidae are "primitive" in morphology, nesting behavior, and social organization.
Unlike other termite species, they have no need to make contact with soil and live exclusively within excavations in wood, lacking elaborate nesting architecture.

Drywood termites have an adaptive mechanism for conserving water. Undigested matter in the alimentary canal passes through specialized rectal glands in the hindgut. These glands reabsorb water from the feces. They can tolerate dry conditions for long periods of time, receiving all of the moisture they need from the wood they live in and consume. Their mandibles are also fortified with zinc, as an adaptation to the mechanically difficult food source of dry wood.

Their diet of dry wood makes many of them economic and urban pests, causing damage to furniture, utility towers, stored wood, and buildings. Kalotermitids' global distribution may be partially attributable to rafting and timber movement. The species Cryptotermes brevis is particularly prevalent as a pest in the United States, and is found in Hawaii, Florida, and along the southeastern coast.

Reproduction
Like other termites, the Kalotermitidae are eusocial. However, their caste distinction is relatively flexible and they lack a true worker caste; instead, pseudergates ("false workers") serve as workers before developing into adult soldiers or alates. The appearance of immature workers in the Kalotermitidae is possible because of their hemimetabolous lifecycle; these immatures are "false" workers because, unlike in the holometabolous eusocial groups,  no pupal stage clearly demarcates immaturity and adulthood, and their role as workers is temporary. Pseudergates can be differentiated from other categories of immatures by the absence of wing buds (which are already present in most hemimetabolous insects in their first instar) and are not necessarily the only constituent of the general work force in a kalotermitid colony.

They emerge from exit holes in wood and take off in all directions. They exhibit phototropic behavior during dispersal flights, often aggregating at lights, with at least one species showing a preference for light with a wavelength between 460 and 550 nm. After landing, they break off their wings which they do by holding their wingtips against a substrate and turning until the wing breaks off at the base. Dealates find a mate and engage in courtship activity. King and Queen mate for life.

Systematics
The Kalotermitidae belong to the "lower termites", a now-defunct paraphyletic assemblage which classifies termites based on the presence ("lower") or absence ("higher") of endosymbiotic gut flagellates in addition to bacteria. The "lower" termites include all termite families except the Termitidae, which alone constitute the "higher" termites. Recent phylogenetic studies have supported the Kalotermitidae as a monophyletic group.

The Kalotermitidae have no recognized classification above genera, the relationships between which are still largely unknown and poorly studied. Limited molecular evidence supports the genus Kalotermes as a basal lineage within the family, so is one of the most anciently diversifying, as well as having two major branches, in which Kalotermes is sister to Ceratokalotermes. However, this partially contradicts older morphological phylogenies, and is the result of a study limited to eight genera.

Genera

References

External links 
 Description of an early Cretaceous termite (Isoptera: Kalotermitidae) and its associated intestinal protozoa, with comments on their co-evolution.
 Kalotermitidae on BugGuide.net
 Kalotermitidae on the Tree of Life web project

Termites
Blattodea families